Thaalappoli is a 1977 Indian Malayalam film, directed by M. Krishnan Nair. The film stars Prameela, Sankaradi, Meena and Sudheer in the lead roles. The film has musical score by V. Dakshinamoorthy.

Cast
Prameela
Sankaradi
Meena
Sudheer
Vincent

Soundtrack
The music was composed by V. Dakshinamoorthy and the lyrics were written by Cheri Viswanath and Mankombu Gopalakrishnan.

References

External links
 

1977 films
1970s Malayalam-language films
Films directed by M. Krishnan Nair